Oleksandr Kvachuk (born 23 July 1983 in Poltava) is a Ukrainian former racing cyclist, who rode professionally between 2004 and 2014 for the , ,  and  squads.

Major results

2001
 UCI Junior Road World Championships
1st  Road race
2nd Time trial
 1st Overall Giro della Lunigiana
2002
 9th Time trial, UEC European Under-23 Road Championships
2005
 3rd Road race, National Road Championships
 5th Firenze–Pistoia
2006
 7th Overall Tour de l'Avenir
2007
 1st Mountains classification Vuelta a Navarra
 3rd Overall The Paths of King Nikola
 4th Overall Vuelta a Cuba
 6th Firenze–Pistoia
 8th Overall Tour of Qinghai Lake
2008
 10th Overall Ronde de l'Oise
2009
 National Road Championships
2nd Road race
3rd Time trial
2011
 National Road Championships
1st  Road race
1st  Time trial
2013
 1st Prologue (TTT) Tour of Romania
2014
 3rd Race Horizon Park 2
 8th Overall Tour of Iran
 9th Overall Tour of Szeklerland

References

External links

1983 births
Living people
Ukrainian male cyclists
People from Oleksandriia
Kharkiv State College of Physical Culture 1 alumni
Sportspeople from Kirovohrad Oblast